Deep Thinka Records is an independent record label and booking agency based in Buffalo, New York. Founded by Anthony Caferro (Tone) and Robert Hill (Speed) in April 1997, it is the largest and most prominent hip-hop label in Upstate New York. Deep Thinka Records produces, publishes and books hip hop music, tours and events geared toward organizing the community, as well as developing strategic partnerships with other independent businesses. The label is proudly independent and active in such operations as Artist Management, Artist Development, Tour Booking, Visual/Film Production, Social Media Marketing and Street Promotion. The current roster includes acclaimed independent artists such as Blueprint, Substantial (rapper), Count Bass D, Billy Drease Williams, Paulie Rhyme, Chuckie Campbell, Tanya Morgan, and Fresh Kils.

History
Deep Thinka Records began as an ambitious idea out of a University of Buffalo dorm room, has now grown into the most influential independent Hip Hop label in "The Queen City" of Buffalo. The label has dedicated itself to expressive artistic revolution, skillful and innovative music, social consciousness and aims to counterbalance the brash materialism, meat-headed misogyny, and glorified violence that have become synonymous with popular rap.

The name of the label was borne out of a collaborative song entitled "How The Real Crew Bang", recorded in 1996 and 1997 for an early internet hip hop crew called Ill Crew Universal (ICU). Caferro felt the previous ICU mixtapes during that time featured primarily California or overseas based artists, and wanted to record a posse cut with ICU members located in the eastern USA for the crew’s third mixtape: The Death of Hip Hop. The song ultimately featured DTR co-founder Robert "Speed" Hill as well as Jason "Furious" Floyd; Iz-Real, The Joker, Quest One, and Kid Logik. In the interest of cohesion, the artists involved decided to credit themselves collectively for the song, and eventually they settled on "Deep Thinkaz".

Shortly after the release of the mixtape, Caferro and Hill decided to form an indie label based on the positive experience of working together, and the exuberant support and response to the song, and "Deep Thinkaz" became Deep Thinka Records. The label was originally formed as a personal partnership in 1997; and in 2001, was legally formed as a Limited Liability Company in the State of New York.

From 2004-2009, DTR, alongside Billy Drease Williams curated the annual Art of Hip Hop event in Buffalo. The Art of Hip Hop focuses on educating young people in Western New York on art, music, mathematics and business.

Roster
 Blueprint
 Chuckie Campbell
 Count Bass D
 Corina Corina
 dubldragon.
 Fresh Kils
 Paulie Rhyme
 PremRock
 Substantial
 Tanya Morgan

Past roster 

 Almax
 Ajent O
 Atherton
 Analog
 Billy Drease Williams
 Catastrophic Minds aka Catastrophic
 Cavalier Johnson
 Cinemaddicts
 Circe Madina
 Classic Material
 Coolzey
 Cup Fulla Nasty
 Danny Switchblade
 DJ Anubus
 DJ Biz:E!
 DJ Cutler
 DJ J-Destiny
 DJ Rukkus
 Edotkom
 Eimaj
 Fresh Guac
 Frigid Giant
 Gr& Phee
 Iz-Real
 Joker
 Keith Concept
 Ketchup Samurai
 Kool Taj the Gr8
 Lady Rezult
 Lamec
 Lazarus aka Ex-S-Ov Jargon
 Loki Da Trixta
 Mad Dukez
 Mic Bronto
 Michael the Archangel aka Ningishzidda
 Moka Only
 ONE Nation
 Pseudo Intellectuals
 Rhyson Hall
 Ripsquad aka Rime Royal
 Siege
 Spittin Image
 Street News
 The Breadmakerz
 The Deck of Cards
 The Immortal MicUnion
 The Leathers
 The Regiment
 Third Son
 Tone At (Pseudo Slang / Pseudo Intellectuals)
 Wise Mecca
 X-Now the Last Emcee

Videography

The Deck of Cards & Lamec - Trilogy
Billy Drease Williams - I Like It
Billy Drease Williams - DUI
Billy Drease Williams - Get Free
Billy Drease Williams - Shut The Gate
Billy Drease Williams - Just Doin’ It
Billy Drease Williams - Run
Billy Drease Williams - Run (Remix)
Classic Material - Check The Rhyme
Mad Dukez - Monsters
Mad Dukez & Fresh Kils - Sexspionage
Mad Dukez & Fresh Kils - Bootleg Bartenders
The Breadmakerz - In The Air
Mad Dukez & Fresh Kils - Sookie Sookie
Mad Dukez & Fresh Kils - Valley View
Mad Dukez & Fresh Kils - World Wide
Mad Dukez & Fresh Kils - Decadent Dead

Discography

1997
 Ice On Water 12" Single (Ripsquad)

1998
 Godly Math (Michael the Archangel)

1999
 O.R.I.O.N. (The Immortal Micunion)

2000
 Illa Godz (Ripsquad)
 Life’s Consequences (The Lady Rezuit)
 Street News (Lamec)

2002
 Notes From The Underground (Cinemaddicts)
 A Declaration of Independents (Immortal Micunion)
 Freedom Writers b/w Metaphor Metropolis 12" Single (Immortal Micunion)
 Obsidian : The Altered States LP (Edotkom)
 The Royalties EP (Rime Royal)

2003
 Boy Meets World (Xnow)
 Mythology (Loki Da Trixta)
 Rebel Radio (hosted by the Ketchup Samurai)

2004
 Heart of the Game 12" Single (Siege)
 Broken Mirrors (Spittin Image)

2005
 Still Raw 12" Single (Rhyson Hall)
 Rebel Radio 2 (hosted by the Ketchup Samurai & Grand Phee)

2006
 Detained At The Border (Grand Phee and Rhyson Hall)
 The Grand Buffet 12" Single (Grand Phee)
 Spanglish 12" Single (Loki Da Trixta)

2007
 Rebel Radio 3

2008
 Get Free Single (Billy Drease Williams)
 I Like It / DUI 7" Single (Billy Drease Williams)
 The Long March (ONE Nation)

2009
 The Gang Green LP (Fresh Guac)
 Good Evening Billy (Billy Drease Williams)
 Rebel Radio 45

2010
 So Cold (Billy Drease Williams)
 Classic Material (Classic Material)
 Good Morning Amy (Billy Drease Williams)
 Head In The Clouds (Deuce Ellis)
 Hip Hop In The Flesh (Kool Taj the Gr8)
 The Leathers (Atherton and pbrain)
 The Restoration (Catastrophic)

2011
 Dope Grindwork (Pseudo Intellectuals)
 Forbidden Tracks (Billy Drease Williams)
 Fresher Than Yours (Kool Taj the Gr8)
 Talkin’ All That Jazz (Cav Johnson)
 Lost In Space, Volume 1 (Billy Drease Williams)

2012
 Monsters EP (Mad Dukez & Fresh Kils)
 #MadWork (Mad Dukez)
 Reform School (Danny Switchblade)
 No Threat (Atherton)
 Seven Tracks. One City. Six Senses. (Mad Dukez)

2013
 Gettin’ Gatsby (Mad Dukez & Fresh Kils)
 Bridge 2 The Stars (The Breadmakers)
 The Open Affairs EP (Mad Dukez & Fresh Kils)
 The Honey 12" Album (Coolzey)
 Monster In A Man Suit, Volume 4 (Mad Dukez)

2014
 EDREYS MMIV (Billy Drease Williams)
 Moar Beets, Volume I (Tone At Pseudo Slang / Pseudo Intellectuals) 
 The Porn Collexxxion (Billy Drease Williams)
 The Sensation (Mad Dukez) 
 The Inspiration (Mad Dukez & CUFX)

2015
 MadWang (Mad Dukez & EdWang)

References

External links
 

American independent record labels
Companies based in Buffalo, New York